{{DISPLAYTITLE:C27H31O16}}
The molecular formula C27H31O16+ (molar mass: 611.52 g/mol, exact mass: 611.1612 u) may refer to:

 Cyanidin-3,5-O-diglucoside (also known as cyanin)
 Tulipanin